SS Chester A. Congdon (originally named Salt Lake City) was a steel-hulled American lake freighter in service between 1907 and 1918. She was built in 1907 by the Chicago Shipbuilding Company of South Chicago, Illinois, for the Holmes Steamship Company, and was intended to be used in the grain trade on the Great Lakes. She entered service on September 19, 1907, when she made her maiden voyage. In 1911, Salt Lake City was sold to the Acme Transit Company. A year later, she was transferred to the Continental Steamship Company, and was renamed Chester A. Congdon, after lawyer and entrepreneur Chester Adgate Congdon. She was involved in several accidents throughout her career.

At 2:28a.m. (EST) on November 6, 1918, Chester A. Congdon left Fort William, Ontario, under the command of Captain Charles J. Autterson, loaded with 380,000 bushels of wheat bound for Port McNicoll, Ontario. At 4:00a.m., shortly after leaving the shelter of Thunder Bay, Chester A. Congdon encountered a heavy storm. Captain Autterson decided to return, and anchored in Thunder Bay until 10:15a.m. when Chester A. Congdon headed back to open water. Shortly after she passed Thunder Cape, a thick fog descended on Lake Superior. She ran aground on the southern end of Canoe Rocks, on the northeast point of Isle Royale at 13:08p.m. The first mate travelled to Fort William to deliver the news of the grounding. On November 8, a storm halted salvage operations, and broke Chester A. Congdon in two. She was the largest financial loss on the Great Lakes up to that point.

The wreck of Chester A. Congdon is the largest shipwreck of Isle Royale. The wreck was listed on the National Register of Historic Places on June 14, 1984, and has become a popular site for recreational divers.

History

Background
In 1843, the gunship USS Michigan, built in Erie, Pennsylvania, became the first iron-hulled vessel built on the Great Lakes. In the mid-1840s, Canadian companies began importing iron vessels prefabricated by shipyards in the United Kingdom. However, it would not be until 1862 that the first iron-hulled merchant ship, Merchant, was built on the Great Lakes. Despite the success of Merchant, wooden vessels remained preferable to iron ones until the 1880s, due to their inexpensiveness, and the abundance of timber. In the early 1880s, shipyards around the Great Lakes began to construct iron ships on a relatively large scale, and in 1884 the first steel freighters were built there. By the 1890s, the majority of ships constructed on the lakes were made of steel. The late 19th and early 20th centuries saw a rapid increase in the size of lake freighters; the first  freighter was built in 1895, the first  freighter was constructed five years later.

Design and construction
Salt Lake City (US official number 204526) was built in South Chicago, Illinois, in 1907 by the Chicago Shipbuilding Company. She was launched into the Calumet River on August 29, 1907, as hull 74. She was built for W. A. and H. B. Hawgood's Holmes Steamship Company of Cleveland, Ohio, and was christened by Dorothy Holmes. Salt Lake City was the third last ship of the so-called "10,000-ton capacity class". She set the record for the fastest completion of a ship between its launching and maiden voyage at a Great Lakes shipyard. Salt Lake City was built for use in the grain trade on the Great Lakes.

Built with an arched frame system designed to create an unobstructed cargo hold, Salt Lake City was equipped with 32 telescoping hatch covers. Salt Lake City was fitted with side-ballast tanks located between the hull plating and the cargo hold beneath the deck arches.

Salt Lake City had a gross register tonnage of 6,530 (or 6,371.39) tons, and a net register tonnage of  4,843 tons.

The engine and boilers were both built by the American Shipbuilding Company in Cleveland.

Service history

Salt Lake City was enrolled in Cleveland on September 11, 1907, and her home port was Fairport, Ohio. She began her maiden voyage on September 19, leaving the shipyard under the command of Captain James Owen. In 1911, the Holmes Steamship Company merged into the Acme Transit Company, which was managed by H. B. Hawgood. On February 2, 1912, Salt Lake City was sold to the G. A. Tomlinson managed Continental Steamship Company of Duluth, Minnesota. She was renamed Chester A. Congdon, in honour of lawyer and entrepreneur Chester Adgate Congdon. Her home port was changed to Duluth.

In April 1912, Chester A. Congdon was in Milwaukee, Wisconsin, when she broke away from the tugs towing her and struck the freighter Charles Weston, damaging two of her own hull plates in the process. She damaged 90 hull plates and around 50 frames, arriving in Superior, Wisconsin, on August 20 for repairs that took ten days to complete. 

On September 26, 1913, Chester A. Congdon struck the breakwater in Fairport harbor, damaging her steering quadrant. She was repaired in Fairport. As Chester A. Congdon was travelling on the Detroit River in October 1915, her bilge scraped along the bottom near Grosse Pointe, Michigan due to low water levels. Several of her rivets were sheered off, causing her hull to leak; she was repaired in Superior.

Final voyage
On November 5, 1918, Chester A. Congdon arrived in Fort William, Ontario, where she loaded 380,000 bushels of wheat at the Ogilvie & Pacific grain elevators. At 2:28a.m. (EST) the next day, she left Fort William for Port McNicoll, Ontario, under the command of Captain Charles J. Autterson. Shortly after passing Thunder Cape, Chester A. Congdon encountered a heavy storm. Chester A. Congdon headed back into open water at 10:15a.m. By that time the wind had stopped, however the waves were still present. After she passed Thunder Cape, a thick fog descended on Lake Superior. At 13:08p.m., Chester A. Congdon ran aground on the southern reef of Canoe Rocks, on the northeast point of Isle Royale, her officers not having heard the fog signal from Passage Island.

A launch, occupied by two fishermen arrived at the scene to render assistance. The fishermen took the second mate to Fort William, however the launch broke down, causing them to not reach their destination until 6:00a.m. on November 7. After the second mate relayed the news, the manager of the Canadian Wrecking & Towing Company, J. Wolvin, dispatched the wrecking barge Empire, and the tugs A.B. Conmee and Sarnia to the wreck. It was reported that Chester A. Congdons first tank on her port side, and the first and second tanks on her starboard side were full of water. It was hoped that removing her cargo would be enough to refloat her. The removed grain was to be loaded onto the barge Crete. On November 8, a storm with  winds forced the salvors to abandon the wreck. Chester A. Congdons crew was removed by Empire, which then sought shelter at Isle Royale. By the time the salvage crew returned to Chester A. Congdons wreck, it had broken in two between the 6th and 7th hatches, and the stern had sunk.

Chester A. Congdon was declared a total loss. On November 29, it was announced that businessman James Playfair of Midland, Ontario, had purchased her wreck for $10,000 (equivalent to $ in ), with the intention of raising it in early 1919. By about December, Chester A. Congdons wreck had sunk, sliding down both sides of the reef.

Aftermath
There were no deaths when the freighter sank. However, the wireless operator on Empire seriously injured his thigh when it became caught in the hoisting gear. Only 50,000 to 60,000 bushels of her cargo was removed. At over $1.5 million (equivalent to $ in ), she was the largest financial loss on the Great Lakes up to that point, as well as Lake Superior's first $1 million shipwreck. As a result of the First World War, the price of wheat was $2.35 (equivalent to $ in ) per bushel. Chester A. Congdons cargo was valued at over $893,000 (equivalent to $ in ), her hull at $365,000 (equivalent to $ in ), and the disbursements at $369,400 (equivalent to $ in ). 

Chester A. Congdon, along with her sister ship D.R. Hanna (lost on Lake Huron in 1919), remained the largest shipwrecks on the Great Lakes until the loss of the self-unloading freighter Carl D. Bradley in 1958. Chester A. Congdon remained Lake Superior's largest shipwreck until the sinking of the freighter Edmund Fitzgerald in 1975.

Chester A. Congdon wreck

Chester A. Congdon became the largest shipwreck sunk near Isle Royale. The bow rests at the base of an underwater cliff at an angle of between 35° to 59°, with the partially damaged stem pointing towards the shoal. The wreck contains an intact pilothouse and forecastle deck, as well as penetrable living quarters, and a windlass room which is accessible through a hole in the forward deck. The stern section rests at a steep angle, and has an intact engine room and stern cabins. The rudder was driven through the deck when the stern hit the bottom.

Chester A. Congdons wreck was listed on the National Register of Historic Places on June 12, 1984. As of 2009, she is Isle Royale's third most frequently visited shipwreck (behind the lake freighter Emperor, and the excursion steamer America respectively), with over 150 dives made out of the 1062 dives made to the wrecks in the park that year.

Notes

References

Sources

External links
 

1907 ships
Ships built in Chicago
Great Lakes freighters
Merchant ships of the United States
Canada Steamship Lines
Maritime incidents in 1918
Shipwrecks of the Michigan coast
Shipwrecks of Lake Superior
National Register of Historic Places in Keweenaw County, Michigan
National Register of Historic Places in Isle Royale National Park
Wreck diving sites in the United States